Kim Eun-hui can refer to:

 Kim Eun-hui (diver) (born 1973), South Korean diver
 Kim Eun-hui (judoka) (born 1973), South Korean judoka
 Kim Eun-hui (volleyball) (born 1948), South Korean volleyball player
 Kim Eun-hee, South Korean playwright
 Kim Eun Gui, member of the World Scout Committee

See also
Kim (Korean surname)
Eun-hee, a Korean given name also spelled Eun-hui